The National Collegiate Athletic Association table tennis tournament is held every February of the year-long NCAA season.

Champions

Number of championships by school

References

Champions list at the official NCAA Philippines website
Presidents and hosts list at the official NCAA Philippines website

Table Tennis
Table tennis competitions